Véliz (or Veliz) is a Spanish surname 
and a Czech toponym,  and may refer to:

People 
Carlos Pezoa Véliz, Chilean poet and journalist

Claudio Véliz, Chilean historian, sociologist and academic
Edwin Westphal Véliz, Guatemalan footballer 

Marta Pizarro Véliz, Chilean educator, UNESCO education expert
, Chilean politician
Mireya Véliz, Chilean actress
Manuel Véliz, Chilean Minister of the Interior, 1925
María Milagros Véliz, Miss World Venezuela 2008
Carlos Véliz, Cuban olympic athlete
Leonardo Véliz, Chilean footballer and politician

Places 
Velizh or Veliz (Russian: Велиж), a city in Russia
Vélizy-Villacoublay, a commune in Paris, France; its residents are referred to as Véliziens
Vélizy 2, a shopping centre in Paris, France